William James Smith (born 8 June 1971) is an English stand-up comedian, screenwriter, novelist, actor and producer.

As co-writer and co-producer of the HBO sitcom Veep, he was among the recipients of two Emmys and two Writers Guild of America Awards, and has received nominations for the Golden Globe Award for Best Television Series – Musical or Comedy and the Producers Guild of America Award for Best Episodic Comedy.

Early life and education
Though born in Winchester, Hampshire, Smith grew up in Jersey and was educated there at Victoria College. His brother is the TV presenter and wine critic Olly Smith.

Stand up comedy
Smith started his career in stand-up comedy, winning awards including Chortle Best Headliner 2005 and Time Out Comedy 2004. One critic called him 'the Hugh Grant of comedy', and he appeared on The 11 O'Clock Show with Sacha Baron Cohen and Ricky Gervais as the character 'Posh Boy'. He took solo shows to the Edinburgh Fringe Festival every year from 2003 to 2006: "Will Smith Is Much Obliged", "Misplaced Childhood" (inspired by his love of the rock band Marillion and their 1985 album of the same name), "Ten Arguments I Should Have Won", and "How To Be Cool".
Smith supported Gervais on his record-breaking sell-out 2007 "Fame" tour, and supported Ardal O'Hanlon and Johnny Vegas on national tours.

Television
Smith is involved with both British and American political satire. He is a writer and one of the executive producers on HBO's Emmy-winning sitcom Veep, starring Julia Louis-Dreyfus. He wrote or co-wrote the Veep episodes: Chung (Season 1); Midterms, Running (Season 2); Some New Beginnings, Fishing (Season 3); Storms and Pancakes, Testimony (Season 4); Thanksgiving,  (Season 5). Smith also wrote on the BAFTA-winning BBC political comedy The Thick of It. He was the only writer on the programme who acted in it – as MP Peter Mannion's inept adviser, The Lord of the Rings-obsessive Phil Smith. He also has a cameo role in the closing credits of In the Loop, the Anglo-American film spin-off.

He is an executive producer on HBO sitcom Avenue 5. Other writing credits include sitcoms Damned and Back (TV series), both airing on Channel 4. With Armando Iannucci and Roger Drew he devised BBC future comedy Time Trumpet, six episodes that screened in 2006. In 2018 he was reported to be working on co-writing a television series of Scarfolk.

In December 2020 he was reported to be working on the television adaptation of espionage novel Slow Horses, filming in the UK and starring Gary Oldman.

Books
Comedy books by Smith include How To Be Cool (Harry Enfield said of it 'Will Smith is the coolest guy in the world (if uncool is the new cool) – he's also terrifically funny'), and The Joy of No Sex, published by Penguin, a parody of The Joy of Sex.

Smith writes for various publications, including the magazine Intelligent Life, in which he learns something new for each issue. Articles have included banjo-playing, ice-sculpting, circus skills and making a soufflé.

In 2015 Smith published his first novel, Mainlander (4th Estate, a division of HarperCollins), a thriller about a schoolboy who goes missing on Jersey. The Independent described it as 'John le Carré meets Middlemarch', and ShortList called it a 'knockout'.

Smith reflects on the difference between writing for television and writing a novel in The Guardian. "The chain from author to reader is short and simple – agent, editor, proofreader, shop/website. In TV, the script will have to be signed off by producers, executive producers, genre commissioners and channel commissioners, and that’s still only a starting point". He cites as his influences John Cleese and Stephen Fry, as well as Charlotte Brontë and George Eliot.

Radio
Smith has appeared on BBC Radio 4 as a guest in comedy panel shows and in his own shows.
 Armando Iannucci's Charm Offensive
 Banter (2002, 2007)
 The Personality Test (2003–09)
 Will Smith Presents the Tao of Bergerac (2007), based on the 1980s TV series set on Jersey. Released as a BBC Audio CD in 2008.
 Will Smith's Midlife Crisis Management (2008)
 It's Your Round (2011)
 Mr and Mrs Smith (2012), sitcom about a couple in marriage counselling

Acting credits

References

External links
 

1971 births
Jersey comedians
British stand-up comedians
Living people
Jersey screenwriters
People educated at Victoria College, Jersey
Jersey male actors
British male television actors